Jacques Ferron (January 20, 1921 – April 22, 1985) was a Canadian physician and author.

Jacques Ferron was born in Louiseville, Quebec, the son of Joseph-Alphonse Ferron and Adrienne Caron. On March 5, 1931 his mother died. He attended Collège Jean-de-Brébeuf but was expelled in 1936. He continued his education at Collège Saint-Laurent and then was readmitted at Jean-de-Brébeuf, only to be expelled again. In September 1941, he was accepted at Université Laval where he studied medicine and on July 22, 1943 he married a fellow student, Madeleine Therrien, whom he divorced in 1949.

November 1943, he enrolled in the Canadian army as a medic and received the acceptance in June 1945. He trained in British Columbia and Ontario and after that was sent to Quebec and New Brunswick as a medic. When relieved of duty in 1946, he settled in Rivière-Madeleine, Quebec. His time in Gaspésie was the inspiration for many of his stories written later. He may have had to leave Rivière-Madeleine because he was denounced from the pulpit as a communist by the local parish priest. In 1947, his father died.

In 1948, he returned to Montréal. In 1949, he moved to Longueuil, Quebec and his first book, L'ogre, was published. He lived among working-class people that lived in Longueuil-annexe in those years, often offering his services for free-refusing to be paid, or omitting to ask. Not in the name of charity, but rather of solidarity- his giving was politically motivated, and he understood that his training as a doctor-his privilege- was paid for
by the misery that the francophone working class was experiencing at that time.

In 1951, he began a 30-year collaboration with L'Information médicale et paramédicale. On June 28, 1952, he married Madeleine Lavallée. In 1954 he became a member of the board of the Canadian Peace Congress. In 1959 he helped in the foundation of the magazine Situations. In 1960, with the help of Raoul Roy, he created l'Action socialiste pour l'indépendance du Québec.

In 1962, he received the Governor General's Award for French fiction for his book Contes du pays incertain.

Ferron was a candidate for the CCF in the 1958 federal election in the Longueuil district.  He finished third with 6.8% of the vote.  In 1963 he founded the Parti Rhinocéros, which he described as "an intellectual guerrilla party". He also began to write for the magazine Parti pris. He also ran for the RIN in the district of Taillon in the 1966 provincial election and outperformed other candidates of the same party, finishing third with a score of 18.3%.  In 1969, he became a member of the Parti Québécois.

In 1977, the Quebec government awarded him the Prix Athanase-David. He was named an honorary member of the Union des écrivains québécois in 1981.

He died of a heart attack 1985 at his home in St-Lambert, Quebec, aged 64.

His life was dramatized by playwright Michèle Magny in her 2004 play Un carré de ciel.

References

Canadian male novelists
Writers from Quebec
Governor General's Award-winning fiction writers
1921 births
1985 deaths
People from Louiseville
Prix Athanase-David winners
20th-century Canadian novelists
Canadian novelists in French
Canadian military doctors
Canadian medical writers
Candidates in Quebec provincial elections
Canadian political party founders
Rhinoceros Party of Canada candidates for the Canadian House of Commons
Candidates in the 1972 Canadian federal election
Candidates in the 1974 Canadian federal election
Rhinoceros Party of Canada candidates in the 1979 Canadian federal election
Rhinoceros Party of Canada candidates in the 1980 Canadian federal election
Quebec candidates for Member of Parliament
Université Laval alumni
Physicians from Quebec
20th-century Canadian male writers
Canadian male non-fiction writers
Co-operative Commonwealth Federation candidates for the Canadian House of Commons